The Mizar Nunataks are a small cluster of rock nunataks near the Antarctic polar plateau,  south of the Wilhoite Nunataks.

References

Nunataks of Oates Land